Love from Paris is a 1957 West German romantic comedy-drama film directed by Helmut Käutner and starring Romy Schneider and Horst Buchholz. It was based on the novel of the same title by Gábor von Vaszary. Vaszary also worked on the screenplay. The film premiered on 12 September 1957 in Lichtburg in Essen. The cinematographer was Heinz Pehlke, who used different techniques to convey the mood of the film, including using a concealed camera to capture the sights and sounds of Paris. The original copy of the film is archived at the Akademie der Künste in Berlin.

It was shot at the Bavaria Studios in Munich and on location in Paris. The film's sets were designed by the art directors Albrecht Becker and Herbert Kirchhoff.

Plot 
A young Hungarian student (Buchholz) and a 17-year-old French girl, Anne-Claire (Schneider) meet in a park in Paris. She calls him "Monpti" (mon p'tit, "my little one"). They fall in love and enjoy a happy time. Anne-Claire claims to come from a wealthy family, but Monpti finds out that she actually comes from poor circumstances. Angered at having been deceived by Anne-Claire, he tells her off on the street and leaves her standing there. As she runs after his taxi, she is hit by another car. Lying in the hospital, Monpti promises he will marry her, but Anne-Claire dies a little while later from her injuries.

At the same time, the story of a second couple is told, whose relationship stands in stark contrast to the main story.

Reception 
The Lexicon des Internationalen Films wrote, "In Paris, a hungry 23-year-old artist from Budapest plays an erotic cat-and-mouse game with an orphaned 17-year-old seamstress, until the girl's death from an accident puts an end to it. A melancholy romantic comedy is told by an old Bistro customer, who functions as a sort of keyhole peeper in a cabaret-like farce. A melodramatic, compact, at times very suggestive battle of the sexes—male lust and feminine stalling tactics, focusing on a fascinating, young Romy Schneider.

Cast 
 Romy Schneider as Anne-Claire Jouvain
 Horst Buchholz as (main) Monpti
 Mara Lane as Nadine
 Boy Gobert as (second) Monpti
 Olive Moorefield as Zaza
 Bum Krüger as man from No. 17
 Iska Geri as woman from No. 17
 Bobby Todd as Fliegenäugiger
 Joseph Offenbach as editorial secretary
 Helmut Käutner as narrator 
 Willibald Eser as an acquaintance of (second) Monpti

Sources 
 Gábor von Vaszary: Monpti. Roman. (Translated into German by the author.) Thiele, Munich and Vienna (2009).

References

External links 
 
 Monpti at filmportal.de/en

1957 films
1957 comedy-drama films
1957 romantic comedy films
1957 romantic drama films
1950s romantic comedy-drama films
Films based on Hungarian novels
Films directed by Helmut Käutner
Films set in Paris
Films shot at Bavaria Studios
Films shot in Paris
German romantic comedy-drama films
1950s German-language films
West German films
1950s German films